Harold Bradley (November 20, 1911 – November 6, 1985) was an American college basketball coach.  He served as the head basketball coach at Hartwick College (1947–1950), Duke University (1950–1959), and the University of Texas at Austin (1959–1967).

Early life
Bradley graduated from Hartwick College in 1934, where he was a member of Phi Sigma Kappa fraternity.

Coaching career
Bradley coached for three years at Hartwick prior to gaining the head coaching job at Duke.

Bradley coached Duke Blue Devils men's basketball legend Dick Groat during his nine-year tenure with the Blue Devils, which spanned from 1950 to 1959 and resulted in Duke's first NCAA tournament appearances. In nine seasons, his lifetime record at Duke is 167–78.

Bradley was hired as the Texas Longhorns men's basketball coach in 1959 and led the Longhorns to two NCAA Tournaments as a result of winning the Southwest Conference outright twice in eight years. His 1964–65 team also tied for the conference championship.

Bradley's 1960 and 1963 Longhorns teams made the Sweet 16 of the NCAA Division I men's basketball tournament. The 1960 team ended up finishing fourth regionally, while the 1963 squad was third. In eight seasons, his lifetime record at Texas was 125–73.

Head coaching record

References
Harold Bradley's obituary

1911 births
1985 deaths
Basketball coaches from New York (state)
College men's basketball head coaches in the United States
Duke Blue Devils men's basketball coaches
Hartwick Hawks men's basketball coaches
Hartwick College alumni
Texas Longhorns men's basketball coaches
Sportspeople from Glens Falls, New York